Now or Never is the debut solo album by Nick Carter, best known as a member of the Backstreet Boys, released on October 29, 2002 by Jive Records. The album debuted at #17 in its first week on the Billboard 200, selling some 70,000 copies during first week in U.S. It fell out of the top 50 in its second week, but sold well enough to be certified Gold by the RIAA in December 2002. Two singles were released from the album, neither of which had any impact on the US charts. The first single, "Help Me", did reach #9 on the Canadian Singles Chart. "I Got You" was a major hit in Europe and Southeast Asia. A sneak preview of the album was attached to the end of the fourth album of little brother Aaron Carter, Another Earthquake, sampling 3 songs

Background
In 2002, when the Backstreet Boys expressed a strong desire to leave their management company, The Firm, Carter chose to remain with them to manage his solo career. As the group began recording their new album without him, he started working on his first solo album. Now or Never was released on October 29, 2002, and it reached No. 17 on Billboard 200 and was certified gold, both in the United States and Canada. The lead single, "Help Me" achieved considerable worldwide success while the other single, "I Got You" was a minor hit in Europe while "Do I Have to Cry for You" is very popular in the Philippines. The album made the charts in many countries as well. He also launched a worldwide tour in support of the album.

Track listing

Personnel
Credits for Now or Never adapted from AllMusic.

Per Aldeheim – engineer, guitar, guitar engineer, producer
Alex G. – digital editing
Dave Arch – string arrangements
Keith B. Armstrong – mixing assistant
Elan Bongiorno – make-up
Martin Brammer – engineer, mixing, Pro Tools, producer, programming, vocals (background)
Michael Brauer – mixing
Nick Carter – illustrations, vocals (background)
Alison Clark – vocals (background)
Gary Clark – bass, engineer, guitar, keyboards, mixing, Pro Tools, producer, programming, vocals (background)
Tom Coyne – mastering
Michelle John Douglas – vocals (background)
Geoff Dugmore – drums
Rickard Evensand – drums
Nick Friend – assistant
Elisa Garcia – art direction, design
Paul Gendler – guitar
Matthew Gerrard – arranger, engineer, instrumentation, producer, programming, vocal arrangement
Stefan Glaumann – mixing
Steve Harvey – percussion
Wayne Hector – vocals (background)
Peter Kahm – bass
Fridrik Karlsson – guitar
Brian Kierulf – engineer
Peter Kvint – guitar
Chris Laws – drums, engineer
Steve Lee – guitar (acoustic), vocals (background)
Chris Lord-Alge – mixing
Steve Lunt - A&R, composer
Steve Mac – arranger, keyboards, mixing, producer
Anthony Mandler – photography
Max Martin – engineer, mixing, producer, vocal engineer, vocals (background)
The Matrix – arranger, engineer, mixing, producer
Pablo Munguia – vocal engineer
Jackie Murphy – art direction
Esbjörn Öhrwall – guitar
Steve Pearce – bass
Adam Phillips – guitar (electric)
Daniel Pursey – assistant engineer, percussion
Rami – engineer, mixing, producer
Cesar Ramirez – assistant engineer, assistant vocal engineer
Brandy St. John – stylist
Christian Saint Val – assistant engineer
Sank – engineer
Andrew Scarth – engineer
José Carlos Schwartz – bass, engineer, producer, vocals (background)
Mark Taylor – engineer, mixing, producer
Matt Tryggestad – vocal arrangement
Michael Tucker – engineer
Jeff Vereb – assistant engineer
Jong Uk Yoon – assistant engineer

Charts

Certifications

References

2002 debut albums
Albums produced by Matthew Gerrard
Albums produced by the Matrix (production team)
Albums produced by Max Martin
Albums produced by Rami Yacoub
Jive Records albums
Nick Carter (musician) albums
Albums produced by Mark Taylor (music producer)